Ischioloncha lanei is a species of beetle in the family Cerambycidae. It was described by Prosen in 1957.

References

Apomecynini
Beetles described in 1957